Nykroppa is a locality situated in Filipstad Municipality, Värmland County, Sweden with 846 inhabitants in 2010.

Riksdag elections 
Being an industrial village, Nykroppa has been dominated by the Social Democrats throughout its electoral history. With the population drastically declining from the 1970s onward, the political dynamics have shifted somewhat and in 2018 the Social Democrats fell a long way short of a majority for the first time in a parliamentary election in Kroppa.

References 

Populated places in Värmland County
Populated places in Filipstad Municipality